Creep, Creeps or CREEP may refer to:

Arts, entertainment, and media

Films
 Creeps (film), a 1956 short starring the Three Stooges
 The Creeps (film), a 1997 film directed by Charles Band
 Creep (2004 film), a 2004 British-German horror film
 Creep (2014 film), an American found-footage horror film
 Creep 2, a 2017 American found-footage horror film; sequel to the 2014 film

Gaming
 "Creep", a carpet of bio-matter Zerg colonies produce in the StarCraft video game franchise
 The Creeps!, a 2008 tower defense video game

Literature
 Creeps (novel), a 2013 young adult novel by Darren Hynes
 The Creeping, a 2015 young adult novel by Alexandra Sirowy

Music

Groups
 Creep (band), an American electronic music band
 The Creeps, a 1980s Swedish band that won the Rockbjörnen prize in 1990
 The Creeps, a 1960s South African band featuring David Kramer

Albums
 Creeps, 2015 album from Indian Handcrafts

Songs
 "Creep" (Mobb Deep song)
 "Creep" (Radiohead song)
 "Creep" (Stone Temple Pilots song)
 "Creep" (TLC song)
 "Creep", a song by Dannii Minogue on the album Neon Nights
 "C.R.E.E.P.", a song by The Fall
 "Creepin'", a song by Eric Church
 "The Creep" (song), by The Lonely Island
 "The Creep", a 1950s instrumental by Ken Mackintosh
 "The Creeps" (Camille Jones song), remixed by, among others, Fedde le Grand
 "The Creeps (Get on the Dancefloor)", song by the Freaks
 "Creeping" (song), a 2018 single by Lil Skies featuring Rich the Kid
 "Creepin" (Metro Boomin, the Weeknd and 21 Savage song), a 2022 song by Metro Boomin, the Weeknd and 21 Savage

Project management
 Feature creep, the gradual and unmanaged addition of features to software
 Instruction creep, the gradual and unmanaged addition of unnecessary instructions
 Mission creep, the gradual and unmanaged addition of additional tasks in a mission
 Scope creep, the gradual and unmanaged addition of additional tasks in a project

Science
 Creep (deformation), the tendency of a solid material to slowly move or deform permanently under the influence of stresses
 Creep, the advancing of a railway wheel more or less than is expected from rolling, without large-scale slip; see rail adhesion
Idle creep, the tendency of a car with an automatic transmission to roll without the brakes engaged or the gear set to neutral
 Aseismic creep, a slow, steady movement along an earthquake fault
 Downhill creep, the slow progression of soil and rock down a low-grade slope
 Location creep, an erratic effect in real-time locating systems
 Superfluid creep, the tendency for a superfluid to "crawl" up the walls of its container; see Superfluidity

Other
 Creep, a creepy person
 Committee for the Re-Election of the President (CRP), mockingly abbreviated as CREEP, an fundraising organization for Richard Nixon's 1972 re-election campaign

See also
 Creeper (disambiguation)
 Creepshow (disambiguation)
 Creepy (disambiguation)
 
 KREEP (coined from abbreviations for "potassium",  "rare-earth elements", and "phosphorus"), component of some lunar rocks